Dejanović is a Serbian surname derived from the male given name Dejan. It may refer to:

 Dejanović noble family, a Serbian noble family prominent in the 14th century.
 Darko Dejanovic (born 1970), American businessman
 Darko Dejanović (born 1995), Serbian football goalkeeper
 Peđa Dejanović (born 1982), Bosnian handball goalkeeper
 Slavica Đukić Dejanović (born 1951), Serbian politician, current Minister of Health in the Government of Serbia.

Serbian surnames